Hindumanes is a genus of jumping spiders (family Salticidae) found in India. , two species have been described:
Hindumanes karnatakaensis (Tikader & Biswas, 1978) 
Hindumanes wayanadensis Sudhin, Nafin & Sudhikumar, 2017

References

Salticidae
Salticidae genera